Jelani is a given name.  Notable people with the name include:

Jelani Cobb (born 1969), American writer, author and educator
Jelani Gardner (born 1975), American-French basketball player
Jelani Jenkins (born 1992), American football player
Jelani McCoy (born 1977), American basketball player
Jelani Smith (born 1991), Canadian-born Guyanese footballer
Jelani Peters (born 1993), Trinidadian footballer
Jelani Woods (born 1998), American football player